The men's 100 kg judo event at the 2015 European Games in Baku was held on 27 June at the Heydar Aliyev Arena.

Results

Final

Repechage

Top half

Bottom half

References

External links
 
 

M100
2015